Ulf Fink is a German politician of the Christian Democratic Union (CDU) and former member of the German Bundestag.

Life 
In 1994, Fink was elected to the German Bundestag via the state list of Brandenburg, of which he was a member for two legislative periods until 2002.

References

External links 

1942 births
Living people
Members of the Bundestag for Brandenburg
Members of the Bundestag 1998–2002
Members of the Bundestag 1994–1998
Members of the Bundestag for the Christian Democratic Union of Germany